George Carroll Sims (May 30, 1902 – June 23, 1966), better known by his pen names Paul Cain and Peter Ruric, was an American pulp fiction author and screenwriter. He is best known for his novel Fast One, which is considered to be a landmark of the pulp fiction genre and was called the "high point in the ultra hard-boiled manner" by Raymond Chandler.

Sims enjoyed a brief career in Hollywood as a screenwriter during the 1930s, including writing the screenplay for the Boris Karloff vehicle The Black Cat. He died in North Hollywood in 1966.

Career
Sims moved to Los Angeles in 1918 and began working as a screenwriter in 1923. Black Mask first published Fast One as five novelettes in 1932. It was then published in book form by Doubleday in 1933. The New York Times described it as “a ceaseless welter of bloodshed and frenzy, a sustained bedlam of killing and fiendishness, told in terse staccato style . . .” Sims wrote a total of 17 stories for Black Mask. He left the magazine when editor Joseph Shaw was fired in 1936. Additionally, Sims had stories published in Detective Fiction Weekly and Star Detective Magazine, and several articles in Gourmet. In 1946, a paperback collection of his best stories called Seven Slayers was published by Saint Enterprises. Sims wanted to change his listed name to Ruric but the publisher insisted on sticking with the name Cain.

References

External links 
 Essay about Paul Cain on detnovel.com
 IMDb listing for "Peter Ruric"
 Paul Cain bibliography at HARD-BOILED site (Comprehensive Bibliographies by Vladimir)
 Paul Cain: An Introduction Boris Dralyuk's extensive introduction to Cain, which includes a wealth of newly discovered biographical material; published in PAUL CAIN: THE COMPLETE STORIES and THE PAUL CAIN OMNIBUS (Mysterious Press/Open Road Media/Black Mask Library), 2013.
 Boris Dralyuk's review article on The Complete Slayers (Centipede Press, 2012) at the Los Angeles Review of Books.

1902 births
1966 deaths
American mystery writers
American male screenwriters
Writers from Des Moines, Iowa
20th-century American novelists
American male novelists
American male short story writers
20th-century American short story writers
20th-century American male writers
Novelists from Iowa
Screenwriters from California
Screenwriters from Iowa
20th-century American screenwriters